The Tamolitch Falls, now a seasonal waterfall, once had a constant flow on the McKenzie River in Lane County, Oregon.  The site is located in the Willamette National Forest.  In the 1960s, water was diverted for hydroelectric use from the stream above the falls; that section of the stream, as well as the falls, ceased to flow except during periods of heavy runoff or when water was diverted from the dams upstream. When this is not the case, the stream goes underground and now emerges below the falls. At the base of the former falls is the Tamolitch Blue Pool, a small body of water known for its blue color.  Elevation: 

The water temperature of the pool is around 38°F which is too cold for even microorganisms to live in. Although the water depth looks to be pretty shallow, the pool is actually 30ft deep.

The pool can be reached from part of the McKenzie River Trail. From the trailhead to the pool, it is a 3.6 mile out and back hike. The trail is heavily trafficked during the spring and summer and parking fills up quickly. The trail welcomes hikers, bikers, runners, and dogs as long as they are on a leash. The beginning of the hike is through an old growth Douglas fir forest. As the McKenzie River flows below, the trail goes up along a cliff which then descends into a dry river bed and from there it eventually goes through an old lava flow. The trail isn’t too strenuous, but it does have an elevation gain of 285ft. The trail also passes by multiple steep cliffs which are hazardous.

References

External links
 https://web.archive.org/web/20110722102425/http://www.kval.com/younews/22696999.html
 https://web.archive.org/web/20110726211430/http://www.oregonwild.org/about/blog/waterfall-showcase-showdown
 Tamolitch Pool - McKenzie River

Landforms of Linn County, Oregon
Waterfalls of Oregon
Willamette National Forest